This species may be confused with: golden barb (P. gelius).

The captive variant popularly known as the gold barb or Schuberti barb is an extremely popular aquarium fish.

Description
Adults of this species have highly arched backs and a short pair of barbels on the upper jaw at the corners of the mouth. The back is light to reddish brown, the sides are metallic green or yellow-green, with a brassy or golden sheen below. The belly is whitish, and yellow-green in males at mating time. Females can be distinguished by their dull colors and their overall bulk.

This species can reach a length of  TL though most do not exceed  SL.

Diet
Their diet consists of invertebrates (such as insects, crustaceans and worms) and plant matter.

Breeding 
An egg-scatter, adult barbs will usually spawn around a hundred eggs, although up to 400 eggs have been observed from an exceptional female.  This breeding occurs at the first light in the early morning.

In the aquarium
The popular gold strain P. semifasciolatus var. Schuberti (gold barb or Schuberti barb) was developed by hobbyist Thomas Schubert of Camden, New Jersey in the 1960s through selective breeding. For many years it was thought to be a distinct species but is in fact a selected sort of the indigenous (green) species which is rarely found in aquaria.  The gold barb is an active, mildly aggressive schooling species that spends most of its time in the mid-level and bottom of the water. Its typical lifespan in captivity is around four to six years.  This gold fish is often used in community tanks by fish keeping hobbyists. It breeds readily in outdoor pools and free-standing ponds during summer months, and withstands cooler temperatures better than other tropical fish. However, it does not stand the cold as well as its original plainer China barb counterparts.

Albino variants of the gold barbs have been produced by Dennis Wilcox in the 1970s in the US. Gold barbs with no black markings have been observed by Stanislav Frank in Europe also around that time. Flesh colour (pink) specimens appeared by the 1990s. Tri-colour, i.e., black, yellow, and pink specimens appeared recently.
In an aquarium, the Gold Barb eats flake food readily, but benefits from the occasional feeding of live food such as mosquito larvae or daphnia.

Gallery

See also
List of freshwater aquarium fish species

References

External links
Gold Barb Fact Sheet

Barbodes
Barbs (fish)
Fish described in 1868
Taxa named by Albert Günther